Farinocystis is a genus of parasitic alveolates of the phylum Apicomplexa. Species in this genus infect insects (Coleoptera).

Taxonomy

This genus was created by Weiser in 1953.

The type species is Farinocystis tribolii.

Host records

Mealworm (Tenebrio molitor)

References

Apicomplexa genera
Parasites of insects